Fountain Hall, formerly Fairchild Hall and Stone Hall, is a historic academic building on the grounds of Morris Brown College in Atlanta, Georgia. Built in 1882, it is the oldest surviving building originally associated with Atlanta University—now Clark Atlanta University—which is the first of all historically black colleges and universities in the American South founded September 19, 1865. It was declared a National Historic Landmark in 1974. It is now named after Bishop William A. Fountain.

Description and history
Fountain Hall is located southwest of downtown Atlanta, in the Atlanta University Center area, on the campus of Morris Brown College. It is set on the south side of Martin Luther King, Jr., Boulevard SW, between Sunset Avenue and Vine Street. The building is a -story masonry structure, built out of red brick. It is capped by a hip roof, and has a five-story tower rising above its recessed entrance. The building was designed by the Swedish-American architect G. L. Norrman in the High Victorian Gothic style.

Atlanta University was founded September 19, 1865, chartered October 17, 1867; offered first instruction at postsecondary level 1869; first graduating class 1873, (normal school for future teachers including women); and awarded its first six bachelor's degrees June 1876. One woman earned a bachelor's degree from Atlanta University between 1876 and 1895. Seven women received bachelor's degrees from Atlanta University between 1895 and 1900. Atlanta University awarded bachelor's degrees 53 years (1876–1929) before exclusively offering graduate degrees. In 1929–30, it began offering graduate education exclusively in various liberal arts areas, and in the social and natural forensics. and opened in 1869 by a missionary society, to provide a high-quality advanced education to southern African Americans. The school offered undergraduate and graduate-level education until 1929, when it became solely a graduate school, working in affiliation with the other schools in the Atlanta University Center. Stone Hall, the most prominent building on its campus, was built in 1882, and housed administrative offices and classrooms. The school produced a large number of prominent African American leaders in business, education and politics. Dr. W.E.B. Du Bois was the most distinguished members of the faculty. Stone Hall was in 1929 deeded to Morris Brown College, which renamed it first to Fairchild Hall and then Fountain Hall.

Restoration campaign 

In 2019, the Atlanta chapter of the Association for the Study of African American Life and History started a "Friends of Fountain" financial campaign to stabilize and preserve Fountain Hall, with the intention of eventually renovating the space as "an academic building and Civil Rights interpretive gallery."

In July 2019, the National Park Service awarded the college $500,000 to help restore the building.

See also

List of National Historic Landmarks in Georgia (U.S. state)
National Register of Historic Places listings in Fulton County, Georgia

References

External links

National Historic Landmarks in Georgia (U.S. state)
Historic American Buildings Survey in Georgia (U.S. state)
City of Atlanta-designated historic sites
School buildings on the National Register of Historic Places in Georgia (U.S. state)
National Register of Historic Places in Atlanta
Morris Brown College